Aq Bulaq may refer to:
 Aghcheh Bolagh
 Aq Bulaq, Kurdistan
 Aq Bolaq-e Mohammad Hoseyn Khan
 Aq Bulaq Murshid
 Aq Bolagh-e Aqdaq
 Aqbolagh-e Sofla
 Aghbolagh-e Olya, West Azerbaijan

See also
Ak-Bulak (disambiguation)
Ağbulaq (disambiguation)
Akbulak (disambiguation)
Aq Bolagh (disambiguation)